FilmFair was a British production company and animation studio that produced children's television series, animated cartoons, educational films, and television advertisements. The company made numerous stop motion films using puppets, clay animation, and cutout animation.

History

Foundation
FilmFair was founded in 1959 by American animator Gus Jekel in Los Angeles, California. After working with Walt Disney Productions and other Hollywood animation studios in the 1930s, Jekel incorporated FilmFair because he wanted the freedom to create live action work as well. The studio was in Animation Alley, a stretch of Cahuenga Boulevard that runs through Studio City in northern Los Angeles.

Jekel's company produced television advertisements—some animated, others live action—and was extremely successful; even Disney was a client.

In the late 1960s, Jekel asked an English colleague, Graham Clutterbuck, to start a European office for FilmFair. Clutterbuck had been producing and coordinating television ads for European advertising agencies and had just lost his job as director general of Les Cinéastes Associés in Paris. Although he was not well-acquainted with animation, Clutterbuck accepted the job offer. Clutterbuck established FilmFair's European office in Paris. It was there that he met Serge Danot, who pitched his ideas for a children's series, but Clutterbuck turned him down. Soon after, Danot signed a contract with the BBC to produce the series The Magic Roundabout. He invited Clutterbuck to watch them film. While there, Clutterbuck met the series' co-creator, Ivor Wood. Later, the two men agreed that Wood would make animated films for FilmFair. The success of The Magic Roundabout paved the way for more stop-motion animation at the BBC. Soon, Wood came up with the idea for The Herbs, which premiered on BBC1 in 1968.

FilmFair London

By this time, Beatlemania had made England a cultural hotspot. Clutterbuck found it too difficult to attract English talent to France, so he moved the office to London. There, Barry Leith joined the company as director of animation. Wood and Leith collaborated on The Wombles, but Wood also had a few ideas for animating Michael Bond's stories about Paddington Bear. Bond was enthusiastic about Wood's artistic vision and began scripting the first series. BBC1 premiered Paddington in 1976 to great acclaim. FilmFair produced new episodes of the programme for three years, and it expanded into a considerable media franchise.

FilmFair continued to produce successful stop motion programmes through the mid-1970s. The company's first classically animated series, Simon in the Land of Chalk Drawings, premiered in 1976. It was adapted from a series of children's books written and illustrated by Edward McLachlan. The company's first series not directed by Wood was The Perishers, a classically animated series directed by Dick Horn.

As FilmFair London continued to produce animated television series for the BBC and ITV, they eventually reached an international audience through broadcast syndication and home video distribution.

Acquisitions
In the early 1980s, Central Independent Television bought a controlling share of the European branch of FilmFair. Graham Clutterbuck died of cancer on 30 April 1988; FilmFair dedicated Bangers and Mash to his memory.

In 1991, Central sold FilmFair to Storm Group (also known as the Caspian Group), one of FilmFair's video distributors. Altschul Group Corporation (AGC) bought FilmFair's American branch in 1992, as part of campaign to acquire more than a dozen film companies. Discovery Education, a subsidiary of Discovery Communications, bought AGC's film catalogue in 2003. As of 2022, Discovery Education is now owned by Clearlake Capital, with Francisco Partners along with Discovery, Inc.'s successor and Warner Bros. parent company Warner Bros. Discovery holding minority stakes.

In 1996, the Caspian Group sold FilmFair London's catalogue and production amenities to Canada-based company CINAR Films, whose purchase included all associated distribution, publication, licensing, and merchandising rights. In 2000, Cinar executives were implicated in a financial scandal, and again in 2001. In 2004, the company rebranded to Cookie Jar Group, which in turn was acquired by DHX Media (now WildBrain) in 2012, thus acquiring the rights to the European FilmFair properties and making DHX the largest independent producer of kids programming with 8,550 half hours up from 2,550.

Productions

Animated television series

Television specials

Pilots

See also
 Ragdoll Productions
 Cosgrove Hall Films
 History of British animation
 List of WildBrain programs

References

Further reading

External links
 
 

British animation studios
Defunct mass media companies of the United Kingdom
Children's television
Television production companies of the United Kingdom
Companies based in Los Angeles
Companies based in Paris
Entertainment companies established in 1968
Companies disestablished in 1996
WildBrain
Discovery, Inc.
Former Warner Bros. Discovery subsidiaries
1968 establishments in California
1968 establishments in England
1996 disestablishments in California
1996 disestablishments in England